The 1923 Michigan Agricultural Aggies football team represented Michigan Agricultural College (MAC) as an independent during the 1923 college football season. In their first year under head coach Ralph H. Young, the Aggies compiled a 3–5 record and were outscored by their opponents 144 to 56.

Schedule

Game summaries

Michigan

On October 27, 1923, the Aggies lost to Michigan, 37–0, at Ferry Field. Harry Kipke's "broken field running figured prominently in Michigan's scoring." Richard Vick started in place of Herb Steger, who was held in reserve for the Iowa game the following week. A newspaper account of the game reported that Vick "played brilliantly, plunging and passing for repeated gains," revealing "a wealth of strength among the Michigan reserves." The 1924 Michiganensian reported that the Aggies "furnished a good practice game" and noted the every player on the Michigan bench was able to play in the game.

References

Michigan Agricultural
Michigan State Spartans football seasons
Michigan Agricultural Aggies football